The 2022–23 Indian State leagues season represents series of state-level football tournaments played as qualifiers to determine teams for the 2023–24 season of I-League 2.

Overview

See also
2022–23 Indian Super League
2022–23 I-League
2022–23 Indian Elite League

References

2022–23 in Indian football leagues
2022–23 in Indian football